Rockaway Creek is a tributary of the Lamington River in Hunterdon County, New Jersey in the United States.

See also
List of rivers of New Jersey

References

External links
 U.S. Geological Survey: NJ stream gaging stations

Rivers of Hunterdon County, New Jersey
Tributaries of the Raritan River
Readington Township, New Jersey
Rivers of New Jersey